The 2013 Invercargill mayoral election finished on Saturday, 12 October 2013 and was conducted under the first-past-the-post voting system using the postal voting system. It was held as part of the 2013 New Zealand local elections.

Background
The candidates for mayor included the incumbent Tim Shadbolt who contested a seventh consecutive term. Other candidates included Shadbolt defeated challengers, Lindsay Dow and Kevin Middleton. Shadbolt was re-elected with a decreased majority.

Results
The following table gives the election results:

References

2013 elections in New Zealand
Mayoral elections in Invercargill
October 2013 events in New Zealand